Rhodeus shitaiensis is a species of freshwater ray-finned fish in the genus Rhodeus.  It is endemic to China, where it is found in the Qiupu River of the Yangtze River drainage.

References

Rhodeus
Fish described in 2011